(born 25 February 1986) is a Japanese idol, and member of SDN48.

Biography
In 2004, Tezuka began her career in the gravure business as Ourei Harada. Her first photobook, Vanilla, was released in Japan just after her eighteenth birthday.  This initial success was followed up with photoshoots in several magazines and websites. In 2004 she won the Miss Magazine annual gravure idol contest put on by publisher Kodansha. According to her blog, Tezuka retired from the gravure idol world as of March 31, 2007.

Tezuka returned to the media spotlight in May, 2008 by reporting via webcast on the press release for Metal Gear Solid 4 held by Sony in Tokyo. Following her return to show business, Tezuka became a weather reporter for a regional company that provides cellphone updates. Her blog reopened during this time period only to shut down again on April 14, 2009.

On April 15, 2009, it was announced that Tezuka would be changing her stage name to Eiko Maeda and joining the pop idol group SKE48.  This is a rather unusual career move for the former Japanese bikini idol who has had breast reduction surgery because even though SKE48 supposedly only allows new members who are under the age of 20, Maeda Eiko was able to join at the age of 23. On November 30, 2009, she moved to SKE48's sister group, SDN48, and change her stage name to Machiko Tezuka. She also managed a café staffed with idols.

Songs

SDN48 B-sides (Undergirl)
Kodoku na Runner (GAGAGA)
Sado e wataru (GAGAGA)
Tengoku no door wa 3 kai me no bell de aku (Ai, Chuseyo)
Abazure (MIN. MIN. MIN)
Yaritagaria-San (Kudokinagara Azabujuuban)
Ue kara Natsuko (Makeoshimi Congratulation)
Owaranai Encore (Makeoshimi Congratulation) (Graduation Song)

The bolded songs are those where she's center.

Stage Units
SDN1st - Yuuwaku no Garter

Black Boy, Jajauma Lady (under), Ganbariina, Futsuu no Anata, Best By..., Aisareru tame ni, Vampire Keikaku.

Minogashita kimitachi e ~AKB48 Group Zenkouen
Black Boy, Tengoku no Door wa 3 kai me no bell de aku, Kodoku na Runner, Touhikou, Vampire Keikaku.

With all the group
Aisareru tame ni

Next Encore
Unit Songs
Yaritagaria San, Tengoku no Door wa 3 kai me no Bell de aku, Abazure, Ue Kara Natsuko.

Shuffle Songs
Futsuu no Anata, Best By..., Ganbariina.

With All The Group
Sado e Wataru, Black Boy, Awajishima no Tamanegi, 1 gallon no ase, Aisareru tame Ni, Touhikou, Vampire Keikaku, Kodoku na Runner, Makeoshimi Congratulation, Owaranai Encore, Kodoku na Runner (Replace).

Background dancer"
Onedari Chanpagne

Minogashita Kimitachi e 2 ~AKB48 Group ZenkouenUnit SongsNever!, Black Boy, Jajauma Lady, Ganbariina, Futsuu no Anata, Best By..., Touhikou, Vampire Keikaku.With all the group'Aisareru Tame ni, Kodoku na Runner, Min. Min. Min., Makeoshimi Congratulation.

Selected works
 Vanilla—Debut photo collection on March 25, 2004
 Jumbo''—Debut DVD on October 21, 2004

References

Sources
 
 

Japanese gravure idols
Japanese television personalities
1986 births
Living people
SKE48 members
Musicians from Hyōgo Prefecture